Police State is a 2017 American sci-fi and adventure film written and directed by Kevin Arbouet. The film stars Sean Young, Seth Gilliam, Kristina Klebe, and Chris Riggi.

Cast
 Sean Young
 Neal Bledsoe as John
 Seth Gilliam as Officer Grady
 Chris Riggi as Carter Brooks
 Kristina Klebe as Katie
 Kelly AuCoin as Mayor

Production
Filming took place primarily in Nassau County, New York.

References

External links
 

2017 films
2010s science fiction adventure films
American science fiction adventure films
Films shot in New York (state)
2010s English-language films
2010s American films